Visa requirements for Mauritanian citizens are administrative entry restrictions by the authorities of other states placed on citizens of the Mauritania. As of 2 July 2019, Mauritanian citizens had visa-free or visa on arrival access to 58 countries and territories, ranking the Mauritanian passport 86th in terms of travel freedom (tied with the passports of India and Sao Tome and Principe) according to the Henley Passport Index.

Visa requirements map

Visa requirements

Dependent, Disputed, or Restricted territories
Unrecognized or partially recognized countries

Dependent and autonomous territories

See also

Visa policy of Mauritania
Mauritanian passport

References and Notes
References

Notes

Mauritania
Foreign relations of Mauritania